The 1888 Ashley by-election was a by-election held on 25 July 1888 in the  electorate during the 10th New Zealand Parliament.

The by-election was caused by the death on 3 July of the incumbent MP William Fisher Pearson. The three initial candidates, in the order of them announcing themselves, were John Verrall, John Ollivier, and Marmaduke Dixon. Ollivier resigned from the contest on 17 July and at the same time, it became known that Alfred Saunders would become a candidate. At the nomination meeting, Dixon won the show of hands. The by-election had a close result and was won by John Verrall, with Dixon in third place just nine votes behind.

Results
The following table gives the election result:

Notes

References

By-elections in New Zealand
1888 elections in New Zealand
Politics of Christchurch